The men's 400 metres event at the 2016 Summer Olympics took place between 12 and 14 August at the Olympic Stadium. Fifty-three athletes from 35 nations competed. The event was won by Wayde van Niekerk of South Africa, the nation's second gold medal in the men's 400 metres (after Bevil Rudd in 1920). Kirani James of Grenada and LaShawn Merritt of the United States became the sixth and seventh men to win two medals in the event, but Michael Johnson remained the only man with two gold medals.

Summary
Kirani James was the Olympic champion in 2012 and was in good form before the competition with a run of 44.08 seconds placing him second on the global rankings. The 2008 Olympic champion LaShawn Merritt topped the lists for the season as the only man under 44 seconds. Wayde van Niekerk ranked third and was the 2015 World Championships winner. At that competition the trio had all run under 44 seconds for medals (a first for the sport) and were the principal challengers to the Olympic title. Two younger athletes, Baboloki Thebe and Machel Cedenio, were the next fastest athletes to enter.
James was the fastest in the first round with 44.93 and Cedenio was the other heat winner under 45 seconds. The 2016 World Indoor Champion Pavel Maslák, David Verburg  and Rafał Omelko qualified as fastest losers. Former European champions Martyn Rooney and Kevin Borlée were eliminated.

In the semi-finals, James had a season's best time of 44.02 to win the round nearly two tenths ahead of Merritt. Cedenio won the 2nd semi final ahead with van Niekerk second. Bralon Taplin won the third semi final.  Fastest loser qualifiers  Karabo Sibanda, Matthew Hudson-Smith and Ali Khamis all set personal bests.

In the final, the three favorites James, van Niekerk and Merritt led from the start. By the end of the turn, van Niekerk had a clear 2 metre lead, Merritt just slightly ahead of James who had closed the gap during the turn. Cedenio was another four metres back, with Taplin another metre back. In the home straight van Niekerk increased his lead while James overtook Merritt, finishing second and third. Cedenio was fourth, Taplin faded, and in lane 1, 18-year-old Karabo Sibanda finished fifth.

Van Niekerk set a new world record of 43.03 seconds, beating Michael Johnson’s previous record set at the 1999 World Championships by 0.15 seconds. Johnson was in the stadium, working in the British commentary booth. This was also the first time that the event has been won and the world record broken by a runner in lane 8.		

Cedenio set the national record for Trinidad and Tobago and Ali Khamis in sixth set the national record for Bahrain.

Background

This was the 28th appearance of the event, which is one of 12 athletics events to have been held at every Summer Olympics. The top six finishers from 2012 (in order: Kirani James of Grenada, Luguelín Santos of the Dominican Republic, Lalonde Gordon of Trinidad and Tobago, Chris Brown of the Bahamas, and Kevin Borlée and Jonathan Borlée of Belgium) returned. LaShawn Merritt of the United States, 2008 gold medalist who was injured and could not finish his heat in 2012, also returned. A new challenger was Wayde van Niekerk of South Africa. James (2011), Merritt (2013), and van Niekerk (2015) were the latest three world champions.

Bahrain and Niger appeared in this event for the first time. Also competing was one member of the Refugee Olympic Team. The United States made its 27th appearance, most of any nation, having missed only the boycotted 1980 Games.

Qualification

A National Olympic Committee (NOC) could enter up to 3 qualified athletes in the men's 400 metres event if all athletes meet the entry standard during the qualifying period. (The limit of 3 has been in place since the 1930 Olympic Congress.) The qualifying standard was 45.40 seconds. The qualifying period was from 1 May 2015 to 11 July 2016. The qualifying time standards could be obtained in various meets during the given period that have the approval of the IAAF. Indoor and outdoor meets were accepted. NOCs could also use their universality place—each NOC could enter one male athlete regardless of time if they had no male athletes meeting the entry standard for an athletics event—in the 400 metres.

Competition format

The competition used the three-round format introduced in 2004. The "fastest loser" system, introduced in 1964, was used for the first round and semifinals. There were 7 first-round heats, each with 7 or 8 runners. The top three runners in each heat advanced, along with the next three fastest overall. The 24 semifinalists were divided into 3 heats of 8 runners each. The top two runners in each semifinal heat and the next two fastest overall advanced, making an eight-man final.

Records

Prior to this competition, the existing world and Olympic records were as follows.

The following new world, Olympic and African record were established during this competition:

The following national records were established during the competition:

Schedule

All times are Brasília Standard Time (UTC-3)

Results

Round 1
Qualification rule: first 3 of each heat (Q) plus the 3 fastest times (q) qualified.

Heat 1

Heat 2

Heat 3

Heat 4

Heat 5

Heat 6

Heat 7

Semifinals

Semifinal 1

Semifinal 2

Semifinal 3

Final

References

Men's 400 metres
2016
Men's events at the 2016 Summer Olympics